Cool Springs High School is a historic high school building located at Forest City, Rutherford County, North Carolina.  It was designed by architect Louis H. Asbury (1877-1975) and built in 1924. It is a two-story on basement, "T"-plan, Classical Revival style red brick building.  The front facade features a shallow four-column Tuscan order portico with echoing pilasters.  In May 1998 it ceased to be used for instructional purposes.

It was added to the National Register of Historic Places in 1999. It is located in the West Main Street Historic District.

Note:  There was also a historic Cool Spring High School in Cool Springs Township, Iredell County, North Carolina.

References

Forest City, North Carolina
High schools in North Carolina
School buildings on the National Register of Historic Places in North Carolina
Neoclassical architecture in North Carolina
School buildings completed in 1924
Buildings and structures in Rutherford County, North Carolina
National Register of Historic Places in Rutherford County, North Carolina
Historic district contributing properties in North Carolina
1924 establishments in North Carolina